Gioiella Prisma Taranto is a professional Volleyball based in Taranto, Italy. It plays in Italian Volleyball League. It was created in 1997 under the name of Magna Grecia Volley, and now it is named Prisma Volley.

History
A first club was founded in 1997, by the president Antonio Di Battista, that moved the Magna Grecia Volley franchise from Matera to Taranto. The team, with the classical red and blu jerseys, start its first championship in Serie A2, achieving the promotion to Serie A1 at the end of 1999-2000 season. The team played two years in the first division with the sponsor names La Cascina and Vini Borgocanale, before it went bankrupt.
In 2002 the Magna Grecia Volley vice-president, Antonio Bongiovanni, founded the Taranto Volley. The team started from Serie D, won in 2003 and, in the summer of the same year, was acquired Belpasso (Serie A2) franchise. The return in the first division arrived in 2004 season, after the acquisition of Unimade Parma franchise. At the end of the year, the team come back to the second division. After a winning season (2005/2006), the team conquered, for the first time in its history, the playoff qualification in 2006/2007 season. At the same time, even the qualification to the Coppa Italia Final Four was reached. At the end of 2007/2008 championship, ended with the keeping of higher division, the club was moved from Taranto to Martina Franca, by management decision.

Team
Team roster – season 2022/2023

References

External links
 Official website
 Team profile at Volleybox.net

Italian volleyball clubs